Tina Chang is an American poet, professor, editor, organizer, and public speaker. In 2010, she was named Poet Laureate of Brooklyn.

Early life
Chang was born in 1969 in Oklahoma to Taiwanese immigrants, who had met in Montreal, where her mother was working as a nurse and her father was earning his doctorate in physics. The family moved to Queens, New York, when she was a year old, where she was raised except for a period during her youth, when Chang and her brother were sent to live in Taiwan with relatives for two years. "I started questioning even at a very young age, well, what is language?" she said. "What is the role of words?" 

Chang earned her B.A. in English literature from Binghamton University. She received her Master of Fine Arts degree in poetry from Columbia University.

Career
Since fall, 2020, Chang has served as Director of Creative Writing at her undergraduate alma mater, Binghamton University. She oversees the Binghamton Center for Writers which includes the Distinguished Writers series, the Global Imagination translation series, Common Ground, a reading series devoted to undergraduate and graduate creative writers, the Binghamton Poetry Project, the Harpur Palate literary journal, the Binghamton Book Awards, and the Writing By Degrees national writing conference.

She published three full-length collections of poetry: Half-Lit Houses (Four Way Books, 2004), Of Gods & Strangers (Four Way Books, 2011), and Hybrida (W.W. Norton, 2019) which was named a Most Anticipated Book of 2019 by The New York Times, O, The Oprah Magazine, NPR, and The Washington Post, and featured in Poets & Writers, the Los Angeles Review of Books among many other publications. It was one of five poetry collections cited by Publishers Weekly in its Best Books of 2019 issue. Along with poets Nathalie Handal and Ravi Shankar, she is the co-editor of Language for a New Century: Contemporary Poetry from the Middle East, Asia and Beyond (W.W. Norton, 2008).

Her work has appeared in numerous publications such as The New York Times, McSweeney's, and Ploughshares. The San Francisco Chronicle has described her poetry as "a vast, beautifully fashioned mosaic of indelible, variegated pieces." One of her chief goals is to "demystify the role of the poet."

She has held residencies at MacDowell Colony, Djerassi Artist's Residency, Vermont Studio Center, Fundacion Valparaiso, Ragdale, the Constance Saltonstall Foundation, Blue Mountain Center, and the Virginia Center for the Creative Arts.

Awards
Chang was elected Brooklyn Poet Laureate in 2010. She has received grants and awards from the New York Foundation for the Arts, the Barbara Deming Memorial Foundation/Money for Women, and the Ludwig Vogelstein Foundation, Poets & Writers and The Academy of American Poets.  She has also won a Dana Award for poetry. She was a finalist for an Asian American Literary Award from the Asian American Writers' Workshop, for Half-Lit Houses

Books

Anthologies
Poetry 30: Poets in their Thirties, (MAMMOTH Books, 2005)
Asian American Poetry: The Next Generation, (University of Illinois Press, 2004)
Asian American Literature (McGraw-Hill, 2001)
Identity Lessons (Penguin, 1999).

References

External links

Homepage for Tina Chang
Audio recording: Tina Chang at the Key West Literary Seminar, 2008 
A Poet Who Doesn't Do Lofty, The New York Times
Why I Write, Publishers Weekly
Poetry Society of America, Q & A: American Poetry
Official Press Release, BP Markowitz Names Tina Chang of Park Slope as Poet Laureate of Brooklyn
Brooklyn's New Poet Laureate Wants to Weave Poetry into Residents' Lives
Brooklyn Poet Laureate Envisions Outreach into Brooklyn Communities
From the Fishouse, audio recordings of Tina Chang's poems
Interview with Li-Young Lee
drunkenboat.com, audio recordings of Tina Chang's poems
New York Times, Princeton Poetry Festival
"Strange Theater"; "Wild Invention"; "Imagine, Refugee", Guernica, November 2007
"Duality", Poets.org

Writers from New York (state)
1969 births
Columbia University School of the Arts alumni
Sarah Lawrence College faculty
Hunter College faculty
Living people
American writers of Taiwanese descent
American poets of Asian descent
American women writers of Chinese descent
American women poets
Municipal Poets Laureate in the United States
Binghamton University faculty
American women academics
21st-century American women